"Love Me Anyway" is a song by American singer Pink from her eighth studio album, Hurts 2B Human (2019). It features American country singer Chris Stapleton and was released as the fourth and final single from the album.

Composition
The song was written by Pink, Allen Shamblin, and Tom Douglas. It runs for three minutes and nine seconds and was produced by Sal Oliveri and Simon Gooding. Strings were arranged, recorded and performed by Stevie Blacke.

Release
The song was officially released to country radio on September 17, 2019, after already charting on the Billboard Country Airplay chart in May and June 2019.

Commercial performance
"Love Me Anyway" reached No. 20 on the Billboard Adult Top 40 chart. The song had sold 171,000 copies in the United States as of December 2019.

Live performances
"Love Me Anyway" was performed at Madison Square Garden by Pink and Chris Stapleton on May 22, 2019.

On November 13, 2019, Pink and Stapleton performed the song at the 53rd Annual Country Music Association Awards.

Charts

Certifications

Release history

References

2019 songs
Pink (singer) songs
Chris Stapleton songs
Songs written by Pink (singer)
Songs written by Allen Shamblin
Songs written by Tom Douglas (songwriter)
Pop ballads
Country ballads
2010s ballads